John Francis Castle (June 1, 1879 – April 13, 1929) was an American outfielder in Major League Baseball. He played three games for the Philadelphia Phillies in 1910.

After his appearance in Major League Baseball, he was a player-manager in the minor leagues for nine seasons beginning in 1911 with the Steubenville Stubs in Steubenville, Ohio. In 1912 he moved to the Lancaster Lanks in Lancaster, Ohio. On June 18, 1912, the team moved to Atlantic City, New Jersey to represent Atlantic City in the Tri-State League. Castle continued there in 1913, after which the team disbanded. In 1914, he was player-manager in Allentown, Pennsylvania. From 1915 to 1916 he was with the Quincy Gems in Quincy, Illinois. In 1917 he moved to the Hannibal Mules in Hannibal, Missouri. In 1919 he was with the Rockford Rox in Rockford, Illinois. His minor league career ended in 1920 with the Wilson Bugs in Wilson, North Carolina.

In 1928, he was head coach of the Saint Joseph's Hawks baseball team.

References

External links

1879 births
1929 deaths
People from Honey Brook, Pennsylvania
Baseball players from Pennsylvania
Bridgeport Orators players
Major League Baseball outfielders
Philadelphia Phillies players
Quincy Gems players
Saint Joseph's Hawks baseball coaches
Steubenville Stubs players
Wilson Bugs players
Minor league baseball managers
Baseball player-managers